Hecphora is a genus of longhorn beetles of the subfamily Lamiinae.

 Hecphora latefasciata Jordan, 1894
 Hecphora testator (Fabricius, 1781)

References

Astathini
Cerambycidae genera